Napoleone Orsini may refer to several members of the Orsini family:
Napoleone Orsini I, brother of Matteo Rosso the Great
Napoleone Orsini (died 1267), founder of the Bracciano branch
Napoleone Orsini Frangipani, cardinal
Napoleone Orsini, condottiero